James Gaffigan (born 1979) is an American conductor.

Biography
Gaffigan was born in New York City. Gaffigan's father, Dennis Gaffigan, was a salesman for Procter & Gamble, and his mother, Cheryl Gaffigan, was a school secretary.   Gaffigan was a student at the LaGuardia High School and the Juilliard School Preparatory Division.

Gaffigan studied music at the New England Conservatory of Music and subsequently at the Shepherd School of Music at Rice University, where his teachers included Larry Rachleff.  He earned a Master's degree from the Shepherd School in 2003. He subsequently developed an interest in conducting, and studied at the American Academy of Conducting of the Aspen Music Festival and School, where his teachers included David Zinman and Murry Sidlin.  He was a conducting fellow at Tanglewood in 2003.  In 2004, he was a first-prize recipient at the Sir Georg Solti International Conductors' Competition in Germany.
 
Gaffigan was assistant conductor of the Cleveland Orchestra from 2003 to 2006.  During this period in Cleveland, he also served as music director of the CityMusic Cleveland chamber orchestra from 2005 to 2010.  He then was associate conductor of the San Francisco Symphony from 2006 to 2009, during which time he served as artistic director of the orchestra's 'Summer in the City' festival.

In Europe, Gaffigan first guest-conducted the Lucerne Symphony Orchestra in 2008.  He returned for a second guest-conducting appearance in June 2009.  In January 2010, the orchestra named him its next chief conductor, effective with the 2011–2012 season.  In June 2015, his Lucerne contract was extended through the 2021–2022 season.  With the Lucerne Symphony Orchestra, Gaffigan has commercially recorded music of Antonín Dvořák and of Wolfgang Rihm for harmonia mundi.  In parallel with the announcement of his Lucerne appointment, Gaffigan was named principal guest conductor of the Radio Filharmonisch Orkest (RFO), with a contract for 4 weeks of concerts per season, effective August 2011.  In September 2013, he became principal guest conductor of the Gürzenich Orchestra Cologne, the first principal guest conductor in the orchestra's history.  In August 2019, the Lucerne Symphony Orchestra announced the conclusion of Gaffigan's chief conductorship of the orchestra at the close of the 2020–2021 season, following Gaffigan's decision to vacate the Lucerne post one year earlier than the time of his most recent contract announcement.

In September 2020, Gaffigan first guest-conducted the Trondheim Symphony Orchestra.  In February 2021, the orchestra named Gaffigan its new principal guest conductor, with immediate effect, with an initial contract of two seasons.  In June 2021, the Palau de les Arts Reina Sofía announced the appointment of Gaffigan as its next music director, effective 1 September 2021, with an initial contract of 4 years.  In January 2022, the Komische Oper Berlin announced the appointment of Gaffigan as its next music director, effective with the 2023-2024 season, with an initial contract of 4 years.  Gaffigan is scheduled to stand down as principal guest conductor of the Radiofilharmonisch Orkest at the close of the 2022-2023 season.

Gaffigan has been married twice.  His first marriage to the writer Lee Taylor produced two children.  Gaffigan and his second wife, Camilla Kjøll, have a son.

References

External links
 Official James Gaffigan homepage
 Askonas Holt agency page on James Gaffigan
 CM Artists agency page on James Gaffigan
 Joel Luks, 'Should hotshot conductor James Gaffigan be on Houston Symphony's short list?'  Culture Map Houston blog, 28 February 2011
 

American male conductors (music)
Aspen Music Festival and School alumni
21st-century American conductors (music)
Rice University alumni
1979 births
Living people
Musicians from New York City
New England Conservatory alumni
Classical musicians from New York (state)
21st-century American male musicians